Zaker may refer to:
Zaker, East Azerbaijan, a village in East Azerbaijan Province, Iran
Zaker, Kerman, a village in Kerman Province, Iran
Zaker, Zanjan, a village in Zanjan Province, Iran
Zaker, Tarom, a village in Zanjan Province, Iran
Aly Zaker (born 1944), Bangladeshi actor and director
Sara Zaker, Bangladeshi actor, entrepreneur and social activist, wife of Aly Zaker